Julie Olthoff (born August 1, 1957) is an American politician who serves in the Indiana House of Representatives from the 19th district. She first represented this district from 2014 to 2018, and was again elected to represent the district in 2020.

References

1957 births
Living people
Republican Party members of the Indiana House of Representatives